Pseudocapacitors store electrical energy faradaically by electron charge transfer between electrode and electrolyte. This is accomplished through electrosorption, reduction-oxidation reactions (redox reactions), and intercalation processes, termed pseudocapacitance.

A pseudocapacitor is part of an electrochemical capacitor, and forms together with an electric double-layer capacitor (EDLC) to create a supercapacitor.

Pseudocapacitance and double-layer capacitance add up to a common inseparable capacitance value of a supercapacitor. However, they can be effective with very different parts of the total capacitance value depending on the design of the electrodes. A pseudocapacitance may be higher by a factor of 100 as a double-layer capacitance with the same electrode surface.

A pseudocapacitor has a chemical reaction at the electrode, unlike EDLCs where the electrical charge storage is stored electrostatically with no interaction between the electrode and the ions. Pseudocapacitance is accompanied by an electron charge-transfer between electrolyte and electrode coming from a de-solvated and adsorbed ion. One electron per charge unit is involved. The adsorbed ion has no chemical reaction with the atoms of the electrode (no chemical bonds arise) since only a charge-transfer takes place. An example is a redox reaction where the ion is O2+ and during charging, one electrode hosts a reduction reaction and the other an oxidation reaction. Under discharge the reactions are reversed.

Unlike batteries, in faradaic electron charge-transfer ions simply cling to the atomic structure of an electrode. This faradaic energy storage with only fast redox reactions makes charging and discharging much faster than batteries.

Electrochemical pseudocapacitors use metal oxide or conductive polymer electrodes with a high amount of electrochemical pseudocapacitance. The amount of electric charge stored in a pseudocapacitance is linearly proportional to the applied voltage. The unit of pseudocapacitance is the farad.

Examples of Pseudocapacitors
Brezesinki et al. showed that mesoporous films of α-MoO3 have improved charge storage due to lithium ions inserting into the gaps of α-MoO3. They claim this intercalation pseudocapacitance takes place on the same timescale as redox pseudocapacitance and gives better charge-storage capacity without changing kinetics in mesoporous MoO3. This approach is promising for batteries with rapid charging ability, comparable to that of lithium batteries, and is promising for efficient energy materials.

Other groups have used vanadium oxide thin films on carbon nanotubes for pseudocapacitors. Kim et al. electrochemically deposited amorphous V2O5·H2O onto a carbon nanotube film. The three-dimensional structure of the carbon nanotubes substrate facilitates high specific lithium-ion capacitance and shows three times higher capacitance than vanadium oxide deposited on a typical Pt substrate. These studies demonstrate the capability of deposited oxides to effectively store charge in pseudocapacitors.

Conducting polymers, such as polypyrrole (PPy) and poly(3,4-ethylenedioxythiophene) (PEDOT), have tunable electronic conductivity and can achieve high doping levels with the proper counterion. A high-performing conducting polymer pseudocapacitor has high cycling stability after undergoing charge/discharge cycles. Successful approaches include embedding the redox polymer in a host phase (e.g. titanium carbide) for stability and depositing a carbonaceous shell onto the conducting polymer electrode. These techniques improve cyclability and stability of the pseudocapacitor device.

References

Capacitors